Asa Managed Reserve is a protected area in the Dusheti Municipality, Mtskheta-Mtianeti region of Georgia  in historical Khevsureti. It protects flora and fauna in highlands with several glaciers.

Geography 

Protected highlands are in the valley of Assa river and it tributary Chkhotuni river. There are several small glaciers in this area.

See also
Khevsureti
Assa River (Sunzha River)
Tusheti Strict Nature Reserve
Pshav-Khevsureti National Park
Erzi Nature Reserve

References 

Managed reserves of Georgia (country)
Protected areas established in 2014
Geography of Mtskheta-Mtianeti
Tourist attractions in Mtskheta-Mtianeti